James Kamana (born 15 August 1985) is a New Zealand rugby union footballer. He plays mostly as a full-back or a winger. He represents the Lions in Super Rugby and the Golden Lions in the Currie Cup and Vodacom Cup. He previously played for Waikato and Tasman in his native country.

He joined Japanese second tier side Kamaishi Seawaves in 2013.

References

External links
 
 Lions profile
 itsrugby.co.uk profile

Living people
New Zealand rugby union players
Rugby union fullbacks
1985 births
Golden Lions players
Lions (United Rugby Championship) players
Male rugby sevens players
New Zealand expatriate rugby union players
Expatriate rugby union players in South Africa
New Zealand expatriate sportspeople in South Africa
People educated at Forest View High School, Tokoroa